The Olympus Air A01 is a Micro Four Thirds system interchangeable lens camera with a 16 MP sensor, which is operated through Wi-Fi from a smartphone that the camera can be clipped onto.  Olympus has announced that there will be an open source application programming interface released with the camera.

See also
Sony QX1

References
DPReview news item

Olympus mirrorless interchangeable lens cameras
Cameras introduced in 2015